John Anthony St. Etienne de Wolf (ca. 1931 – May 28, 2003) was a journalist, economist and politician in British Columbia, Canada. He served as leader of the British Columbia Conservative Party from 1969 to 1971.

De Wolf was a special adviser to the Canadian finance minister and then worked as a journalist in the field of finance and economics. He was elected to the Conservative party leadership in June 1969. De Wolf was defeated by Derrill Warren in a convention held in November 1971. After losing the party leadership, he worked as a consultant and also was a policy adviser to the provincial government.

De Wolf died at St. Paul's Hospital in Vancouver in 2003.

References 

Year of birth uncertain
2003 deaths
British Columbia Conservative Party leaders